Shahid Navvab Safavi Expressway starts from Tohid Tunnel and is Chamran Expressway renamed after passing the tunnel. It continues south until it reaches the junction between Qale Morghi Expressway and Niruye Havaei Expressway. It is named after Navvab Safavi.

References

Expressways in Tehran